Vanessa Neo Yu Yan (born 19 June 1987) is a Singaporean former badminton player specializing in doubles. She represented Singapore in 2014 Commonwealth Games, where she won a bronze medal in the team competition.

Achievements

BWF Grand Prix 
The BWF Grand Prix had two levels, the Grand Prix and Grand Prix Gold. It was a series of badminton tournaments sanctioned by the Badminton World Federation (BWF) and played between 2007 and 2017.

Mixed doubles

  BWF Grand Prix Gold tournament
  BWF Grand Prix tournament

BWF International Challenge/Series 
Women's doubles

Mixed doubles

  BWF International Challenge tournament
  BWF International Series tournament

References

External links 
 

1987 births
Living people
Singaporean people of Chinese descent
Singaporean female badminton players
Badminton players at the 2006 Asian Games
Badminton players at the 2014 Asian Games
Asian Games bronze medalists for Singapore
Asian Games medalists in badminton
Medalists at the 2006 Asian Games
Badminton players at the 2010 Commonwealth Games
Badminton players at the 2014 Commonwealth Games
Commonwealth Games bronze medallists for Singapore
Commonwealth Games medallists in badminton
Competitors at the 2005 Southeast Asian Games
Competitors at the 2007 Southeast Asian Games
Competitors at the 2009 Southeast Asian Games
Competitors at the 2011 Southeast Asian Games
Competitors at the 2013 Southeast Asian Games
Competitors at the 2015 Southeast Asian Games
Southeast Asian Games silver medalists for Singapore
Southeast Asian Games bronze medalists for Singapore
Southeast Asian Games medalists in badminton
21st-century Singaporean women
Medallists at the 2014 Commonwealth Games